Timothy or Tim Grant may refer to:

Tim Grant (general), Canadian army general
Tim Grant (rugby league) (born 1988), Australian rugby league footballer
T. J. Grant (born 1984), Canadian mixed martial artist